USRC Guthrie was a small patrol vessel, built for the United States Revenue Cutter Service in 1895.  She was named after James Guthrie, 21st Secretary of the Treasury. She was the third ship of that name, the first two being launched in 1868 and 1882.

The vessel was temporarily transferred from the United States Treasury to the United States Navy, for wartime service, during the Spanish American War, World War I and World War II.  She was permanently transferred to the newly created United States Coast Guard, when it was formed from the Revenue Cutter Service, the United States Lighthouse Service and the United States Lifeboat Service.

Benjamin Bottoms served as a radio operator aboard her, early in World War II.

She was scrapped in 1942.

Specifications

Guthrie was a steel-hulled vessel powered a triple expansion steam engine. She displaced 149 tons, and had a crew of 10.

Operational history

During the Spanish–American War she was assigned to patrol Baltimore. On May 30, 1903 she was involved in a minor collision with the steamship  in the area of Baltimore, suffering only $80 in damage. During World War I she was assigned to patrol Philadelphia. During World War II she patrolled Portland, Maine.

See also

References

Ships of the United States Coast Guard
Ships of the United States Revenue Cutter Service
1895 ships